The Guelphs and Ghibellines were factions supporting the Pope and the Holy Roman Emperor, respectively, in the Italian city-states of Central Italy and Northern Italy.

During the 12th and 13th centuries, rivalry between these two parties formed a particularly important aspect of the internal politics of medieval Italy. The struggle for power between the Papacy and the Holy Roman Empire arose with the Investiture Controversy, which began in 1075, and ended with the Concordat of Worms in 1122.

History

Origins
The Guelph vs Ghibelline conflict initially arose from the division caused by the Investiture Controversy, about whether secular rulers or the pope had the authority to appoint bishops and abbots. Upon the death of Emperor Henry V, of the Salian dynasty, the dukes elected an opponent of his dynasty, Lothair III, as the new emperor. This displeased the Hohenstaufen, who were allied with and related to the old dynasty.

Out of fear of the Hohenstaufen, Lothair III placed himself under the pope's overlordship. He ceded to the pope all Imperial rights under Henry V's Concordat of Worms. War then broke out in Germany between those who supported the Hohenstaufen, and those who were aligned to Lothair and the pope. Upon Lothair's death, the Hohenstaufen Conrad III was elected, while Lothair's heir, Henry the Proud, of the House of Welf, continued fighting.

Guelph (often spelled Guelf; in Italian Guelfo, plural Guelfi) is an Italian form of the name of the House of Welf, the family of the dukes of Bavaria (including the namesake Duke Welf II of Bavaria, as well as Henry the Lion). The Welfs were said to have used the name as a rallying cry during the Siege of Weinsberg in 1140, in which the rival Hohenstaufens (led by Conrad III) used "Wibellingen" (the name of a castle today known as Waiblingen, as their cry; "Wibellingen" subsequently became Ghibellino in Italian).

Thus, the Hohenstaufen faction became known as the Ghibellines and the Welfs eventually became known as the Guelphs. The Ghibellines were the imperial party, while the Guelphs supported the pope.

The names were probably introduced to Italy during the reign of Frederick Barbarossa. When Frederick conducted military campaigns in Italy to expand imperial power there, his supporters became known as Ghibellines (Ghibellini). The Lombard League and its allies were defending the liberties of the urban communes against the Emperor's encroachments and became known as Guelphs (Guelfi).

Broadly speaking, Guelphs tended to come from wealthy mercantile families, whereas Ghibellines were predominantly those whose wealth was based on agricultural estates. Guelph cities tended to be in areas where the emperor was more of a threat to local interests than the pope, and Ghibelline cities tended to be in areas where the enlargement of the Papal States was the more immediate threat. The Lombard League defeated Frederick at the Battle of Legnano in 1176. Frederick recognized the full autonomy of the cities of the Lombard league under his nominal suzerainty.

The division developed its dynamic in the politics of medieval Italy, and it persisted long after the confrontation between emperor and pope had ceased. Smaller cities tended to be Ghibelline if the larger city nearby was Guelph, as Guelph Republic of Florence and Ghibelline Republic of Siena faced off at the Battle of Montaperti, 1260. Pisa maintained a staunch Ghibelline stance against her fiercest rivals, the Guelph Republic of Genoa and Florence.

Adherence to one of the parties could, therefore, be motivated by local or regional political reasons. Within cities, party allegiances differed from guild to guild, rione to rione, and a city could easily change party after the internal upheaval. Moreover, sometimes traditionally Ghibelline cities allied with the Papacy, while Guelph cities were even punished with interdict.

Contemporaries did not use the terms Guelph and Ghibellines much until about 1250, and then only in Tuscany (where they originated), with the names "church party" and "imperial party" preferred in some areas.

13th–14th centuries

At the beginning of the 13th century, Philip of Swabia, a Hohenstaufen, and Otto of Brunswick, a Welf, were rivals for the imperial throne. Philip was supported by the Ghibellines as a son of Frederick I, while Otto was supported by the Guelphs. Although the Guelphs initially succeeded in getting Otto crowned as Emperor, Otto turned against the Papacy, was excommunicated, and was replaced with Philip's heir Emperor Frederick II. Frederick II was an enemy of both Otto and the papacy, and during Frederick's reign, the Guelphs became more strictly associated with the papacy while the Ghibellines became supporters of the Empire and Frederick in particular. Pope Gregory IX excommunicated Frederick II in 1227 for failing to go on Crusade, then again for going on the Sixth Crusade (1228-1229) while excommunicated. While Frederick was in the Crusader states, this division developed there, and his regent in Italy fought a war with the Pope. That war was ended and the excommunication was lifted in 1230, but the hostility continued.

In 1237, Frederick entered Italy with a large army, intending to subdue the defiant cities of the Lombard League. Pope Gregory tried to broker a peace, but failed. Frederick defeated the League at Cortenuova and refused all peace offers from them. He besieged Brescia, but was repulsed.

In 1239, Frederick was again excommunicated by Pope Gregory. In response, he expelled Franciscan and the Dominican friars from Lombardy and made his son Enzo Imperial vicar in Italy. He also annexed Romagna, Marche, the Duchy of Spoleto, and part of the Papal States, and marched through Tuscany hoping to capture Rome. He was forced to retreat, sacking the city of Benevento. Soon the Ghibelline city of Ferrara fell and Frederick once more advanced in Italy, capturing Ravenna and Faenza.

The Pope called a council, but an Imperial-Pisan fleet defeated a Papal fleet carrying cardinals and prelates from Genoa in the Battle of Giglio. Frederick continued marching towards Rome. Pope Gregory soon died. Frederick, seeing the war being directed against the Church and not the Pope, withdrew his forces, releasing two cardinals from Capua, although Frederick marched against Rome over and over throughout 1242 and 1243.

A new pope – Innocent IV – was elected. At first, Frederick was content with the election since Innocent had relatives in the Imperial camp. However, the new Pope immediately turned against Frederick. When the City of Viterbo rebelled, the Pope backed the Guelphs. Frederick immediately marched to Italy and besieged Viterbo.

The pope signed a peace treaty with the emperor, relieving the city. After the Emperor left, the Cardinal Raniero Capocci, as the leader of Viterbo, had the garrison massacred. The Pope made another treaty but he immediately broke it and continued to back the Guelphs. The Pope supported Henry Raspe, Landgrave of Thuringia as King of the Romans and soon plotted to have Frederick killed. When the attempt failed the pope fled to Liguria.

Soon the tide turned against the imperial party as the Lombard city of Parma rebelled. Enzo – who had not been present – asked his father for help. Frederick and Ezzelino III da Romano, the Tyrant of Verona, besieged the city. The imperial camp was ambushed by the Guelphs and in the ensuing Battle of Parma the imperial party was routed, losing much of their treasury.

Frederick retreated and gathered another army but the resistance of Parma encouraged other cities to rebel and Frederick was powerless to do anything. Things became worse for the imperial party as the Ghibellines were defeated in the Battle of Fossalta by the Bolognese, at which Enzo was captured and imprisoned until his death. Although the Ghibellines started recovering, defeating the Guelphs in the Battle of Cingoli, Frederick by then was ill. Before he died much of his territory was recovered by his son Conrad IV, thus leaving Italy at peace for a very few years.

After the death of Frederick II in 1250, the Ghibellines were supported by Conrad IV and later King Manfred of Sicily. The Guelphs were supported by Charles I of Naples. The Sienese Ghibellines inflicted a noteworthy defeat upon Florentine Guelphs at the Battle of Montaperti (1260). After the Hohenstaufen dynasty lost the Empire when Charles I executed Conrad V in 1268, the terms Guelph and Ghibelline became associated with individual families and cities, rather than the struggle between empire and papacy.

In that period the stronghold of Italian Ghibellines was the city of Forlì, in Romagna. That city remained with the Ghibelline factions, partly as a means of preserving its independence, rather than out of loyalty to the temporal power, as Forlì was nominally in the Papal States. Over the centuries, the papacy tried several times to regain control of Forlì, sometimes by violence or by allurements.

The division between Guelphs and Ghibellines was especially important in Florence, although the two sides frequently rebelled one against the other and struggled for power in many of the other northern Italian cities as well. Essentially the two sides were now fighting either against German influence (in the case of the Guelphs) or against the temporal power of the Pope (in the case of the Ghibellines). In Florence and elsewhere the Guelphs usually included merchants and burghers, while the Ghibellines tended to be noblemen. They adopted peculiar customs such as wearing a feather on a particular side of their hats, or cutting fruit a particular way, according to their affiliation.

The struggle between Guelphs and Ghibellines was noticeable in the Republic of Genoa, where the former were called "rampini" (lit.: "grappling hooks") and the latter "mascherati" (lit.: "masked"), although there is no clear etymology for these names. Genoese families like Fieschi and Grimaldi conventionally sided with the Guelph party, in contrast with the Doria and some branches of the Spinola families. While Genoa was often under Guelph rule in the early years of the 13th century, in 1270, Ghibellines Oberto Spinola and Oberto Doria managed to revolt against Guelphs and started a dual government which lasted a couple of decades. Guelph families fled to their strongholds east (Fieschi) and west (Grimaldi). They were forced to cease their resistance after several military campaigns, which ended with their readmission to Genoese political life, after paying war expenses.

White and Black Guelphs

After the Tuscan Guelphs finally defeated the Ghibellines in 1289 at the Battle of Campaldino and at Vicopisano, the Guelphs began infighting. By 1300, the Florentine Guelphs had divided into the Black and White Guelphs. The Blacks continued to support the Papacy, while the Whites were opposed to Papal influence, specifically the influence of Pope Boniface VIII. Dante was among the supporters of the White Guelphs. In 1302 he was exiled when the Black Guelphs took control of Florence.

Those who were not connected to either side or who had no connections to either Guelphs or Ghibellines considered both factions unworthy of support but were still affected by changes of power in their respective cities. Emperor Henry VII was disgusted by supporters of both sides when he visited Italy in 1310.

In 1325, the city-states of Guelph Bologna and Ghibelline Modena clashed in the War of the Bucket, resulting in Modena's victory at the Battle of Zappolino, which led to a resurgence of Ghibelline fortunes. In 1334, Pope Benedict XII threatened people who used either the Guelph or Ghibelline name with excommunication.

Later history

The term Ghibelline continued to indicate attachment to the declining Imperial authority in Italy, and saw a brief resurgence during the Italian campaigns of Emperors Henry VII (1310) and Louis IV (1327).

Since the Papal grant of Sicily (Southern Italy) to the French prince Charles I of Anjou, the Guelphs had also taken on a pro-French orientation. As late as the 16th century, Ghibellines like the Colonna or Gonzaga still fought for Charles V, Holy Roman Emperor, while Guelphs like the Orsini and Este still fought for the French.

During the French-dominated Avignon Papacy, Pope John XXII, who was aligned with the French-allied King John of Bohemia excommunicated John's rival Emperor Louis IV in 1324 and threatened heresy charges against the Ghibellines. The Ghibellines then supported Louis' invasion of Italy and coronation as King of Italy and Holy Roman Emperor.

In Milan, the Guelphs and Ghibellines cooperated in the creation of the Golden Ambrosian Republic in 1447, but over the next few years engaged in some intense disputes. After the initial leadership of the Ghibellines, the Guelphs seized power at the election of the Captains and Defenders of the Liberty of Milan. The Guelphic government became increasingly autocratic, leading to a Ghibelline conspiracy led by Giorgio Lampugnino and Teodoro Bossi. It failed, and many Ghibellines were massacred in 1449.

Others fled, including the prominent Ghibelline Vitaliano I Borromeo, who was sheltered in his County of Arona. Public opinion turned against the Guelphs. In the next elections the Ghibellines were briefly victorious, but were deposed after imprisoning Guelph leaders Giovanni Appiani and Giovanni Ossona. After Francesco I Sforza was made Duke by Milan's senate in 1450, many Ghibellines who had fled such as Filippo Borromeo and Luisino Bossi were restored to positions of prominence in Milan.

In the 15th century, the Guelphs supported Charles VIII of France during his invasion of Italy at the start of the Italian Wars, while the Ghibellines were supporters of the emperor Maximilian I, Holy Roman Emperor. Cities and families used the names until Charles V, Holy Roman Emperor, firmly established imperial power in Italy in 1529.

In the course of the Italian Wars of 1494 to 1559, the political landscape changed so much that the former division between Guelphs and Ghibellines became obsolete. This is evident with the election of Pope Paul V (1605), the first to bear the "Ghibelline" Reichsadler in chief on his Papal coat of arms.

Modern aftermath

On 25 March 2015, the Parte Guelfa was reconstituted as Christian order and archconfraternity to serve the Catholic Church and the Catholic Archdiocese of Florence, guided by the Captain-General Andrea Claudio Galluzzo under the custody of Consul Luciano Artusi. The Mayor of Florence established the headquarters of the reborn Guelph Party in the historic Palazzo di Parte Guelfa in the city.

Allegiance of the main Italian cities

In heraldry

Some individuals and families indicated their faction affiliation in their coats of arms by including an appropriate heraldic "chief" (a horizontal band at the top of the shield). Guelphs had a capo d'Angio or "chief of Anjou", containing yellow fleurs-de-lys on a blue field, with a red heraldic "label", while Ghibellines had a capo dell'impero or "chief of the empire", with a form of the black German imperial eagle on a golden background.

Families also distinguished their factional allegiance by the architecture of their palaces, towers, and fortresses. Ghibelline structures had "swallow-tailed" crenellations, while those of the Guelphs were square.

In vexillology 
During the 12th and 13th centuries, armies of the Ghibelline communes usually adopted the war banner of the Holy Roman Empirewhite cross on a red fieldas their own. Guelph armies usually reversed the colorsred cross on white.  These two schemes are prevalent in the civic heraldry of northern Italian towns and remain a revealing indicator of their past factional leanings. 

Traditionally Ghibelline towns like Pavia, Novara, Como, Treviso and Asti, continue to sport the Ghibelline cross.  The Guelph cross can be found on the civic arms of traditionally Guelph towns like Milan, Vercelli, Alessandria, Padua, Reggio and Bologna.

In art and popular culture

In literature

 In Dante Alighieri's Inferno (1300s), participants in the conflict are featured prominently. For example, Mosca dei Lamberti is the character suffering in hell for the schism for which he was held responsible.
 In The Decameron (1350s) by Giovanni Boccaccio, one of the ladies is a firm adherent of the Ghibellines to the point where she will not even praise Charlemagne.
 The Life of Castruccio Castracani (1520) by Niccolò Machiavelli tells the struggle between the Guelphs and Ghibellines in the city of Lucca during the reign of Tuscan condottiere, Castruccio Castracani.
 In the notes to the poem The Shepheardes Calender (1579), English poet Edmund Spenser's annotator E. K. claimed (incorrectly) that the words "Elfs" and "Goblins" derive etymologically from Guelphs and Ghibellines.
 Valperga (1823) is a historical novel by Mary Shelley influenced heavily by both Dante and Boccaccio, that deals directly with the Guelph and Ghibelline conflict. Its central figure, Castruccio Castracani, is a Ghibelline, while his love, the Duchess of Valperga, is a Guelph.
 In Schopenhauer's essay "On Women", he claimed that women are usually unfriendly toward each other. The reason is that "with women only one thing is decisive, namely, which man they please." Schopenhauer asserted that "Even when they meet in the street, women look at one another like Guelphs and Ghibellines." ("Schon beim Begegnen auf der Straße sehn sie einander an wie Guelfen und Ghibellinen.")
 In The Cantos (1915–1962), Ezra Pound makes repeated mention of both Guelfs and Ghibellines. The pro-Papal Guelfs are associated with usury and corruption while the pro-Imperial Ghibellines are associated with law and order. The famous "fascist" canto, LXXII, makes mention of Ezalino (who would appear to be the sometime-Ghibelline leader Ezzelino III da Romano), "who didn't believe the world was made by a Jew" (i.e., he rejected papal and Christian claims and embraced the antisemitism of World War II in the fascist milieu in which the Canto was written).
 In Christ Stopped at Eboli (1945), Carlo Levi compares the peasants and gentry of Aliano to the Guelphs and Ghibellines, respectively, with the Fascist regime as the Holy Roman Empire and the desire to be left alone for local rule as the Papacy.
 In The Lost Steps (1953), by Alejo Carpentier, the narrator refers to the Guelphs and Ghibellines to describe the nature of the sudden guerrilla fighting that breaks out in the streets of a Latin American city.
 In The Quentaris Chronicles fantasy book series (2003–2009), the Duelphs and Nibhellines are feuding families based on the Guelphs and Ghibellines.

In film
 The Flame and the Arrow (1950) starring Burt Lancaster, Virginia Mayo and Nick Cravat is set in the Guelph and Ghibelline era of 12th century Lombardy.
 Barbarossa (2009) starring Rutger Hauer, Raz Degan and F. Murray Abraham is set during the struggles between Guelph and Ghibellines and in particular during the battle of Legnano.
 In Jeff Baena's The Little Hours (2017), based on The Decameron, Nick Offerman plays a minor Lord given to long, rambling conspiracy theories about how the Guelphs are coming for him.

In visual art 
 Wall mural in Grossi Florentino, executed by students of Napier Waller under supervision.

In music 
 Riccardo Zandonai's early 20th-century opera Francesca da Rimini follows a plot of the character from Dante's Inferno, part of which includes a battle between the Guelphs and Ghibellines.

See also
 Cæsaropapism
 Guelph, Ontario
 Hierocracy (medieval)
 Royal Guelphic Order

References

Bibliography

External links 
 
 

 
12th century in Italy
12th century in the Holy Roman Empire
13th century in Italy
13th century in the Holy Roman Empire
14th century in Italy
14th century in the Holy Roman Empire
15th century in Italy
Geopolitical rivalry
Kingdom of Italy (Holy Roman Empire)
Frederick II, Holy Roman Emperor